Kentrell DeSean Gaulden (born October 20, 1999), known professionally as YoungBoy Never Broke Again (also known as NBA YoungBoy or simply YoungBoy), is an American rapper. Between 2015 and 2017, he released eight independent mixtapes and steadily garnered a cult following through his work. In late 2017, Gaulden was signed to Atlantic Records. In January 2018, he released the single "Outside Today", which peaked at number 31 on the Billboard Hot 100 chart. The song became the lead single for his debut studio album Until Death Call My Name (2018) which peaked at number 7 on the US Billboard 200.

In October 2019, Gaulden released the single "Bandit" (with Juice WRLD), which became his first top-ten single. A week later, he released AI YoungBoy 2 (2019), which debuted at number one on the Billboard 200. In April 2020, he released 38 Baby 2, becoming his second chart-topping project on the Billboard 200. Later that year, Gaulden released his second studio album Top (2020), which followed suit as his third chart-topping project in less than a year. In September 2021, Sincerely, Kentrell (2021) was released during his incarceration, topping the charts again, making him the third artist besides 2Pac and Lil Wayne to have a chart-topping album while incarcerated. In August 2022, he released his fourth studio album, The Last Slimeto (2022), which marked his final studio album with Atlantic Records. In January 2023, he released his fifth album, I Rest My Case (2023), his first with Motown.

Despite his success, Gaulden's career hast been marked by a long history of legal issues that began in 2016, and has released multiple projects during his incarcerations.

Early life
Kentrell DeSean Gaulden was born on October 20, 1999, in Baton Rouge, Louisiana. He broke his neck while wrestling as a toddler, the injury requiring a head brace until the spine healed. The brace left permanent scars on his forehead. Gaulden was raised mainly by his maternal grandmother, Alice Gaulden, due to his father being sentenced to 55 years in prison. He dropped out of high school in ninth grade. While in juvenile detention for a robbery charge, he began writing lyrics for his debut project.

After he was released, Gaulden's grandmother died of heart failure in 2010 and he was sent to a group home in which he noted that he'd get beat up:

He later moved in with his friend and fellow Baton Rouge rapper, OG3Three Never Broke Again. The two then used acts of criminality to begin to pay for studio time.

Career

2015–2017: Career beginnings and AI YoungBoy 
Gaulden first began producing music with a microphone he bought from Walmart when he was fourteen years old. He released his first mixtape, Life Before Fame in 2015. A string of other mixtapes followed including Mind of a Menace, Mind of a Menace 2, and Before I Go. Gaulden attracted attention with his October 2016 mixtape, 38 Baby which featured fellow Baton Rouge natives, Boosie Badazz, Kevin Gates, and fellow rappers Stroke Tha Don and NBA 3Three. A week later, Gaulden released another mixtape titled Mind of a Menace 3 on November 4, 2016. Gaulden's quick rise to popularity could also be attributed to his "song-for-song rap beef" with fellow Baton Rouge rapper Scotty Cain in December 2015, in which songs from both rappers included death threats. Although no real violence ever occurred between the two Baton Rouge rappers, their feuding attracted a lot of attention.

In November 2016, Gaulden was arrested in Austin, Texas on suspicion of attempted first-degree murder in connection with an alleged drive-by shooting. While in jail in East Baton Rouge Parish, Louisiana, Gaulden re-released his two mixtapes, Before I Go and Mind of a Menace 3. Gaulden was released from prison in May 2017 after taking a plea deal and posting bail. A week after leaving prison, Gaulden released the single, "Untouchable".

In July 2017, Gaulden released a video for his song, "41", that included cameos from notable artists including, Meek Mill, Young Thug, 21 Savage, Boosie Badazz, and Yo Gotti. On August 3, 2017, he released his mixtape, AI YoungBoy which charted at 24 on the Billboard 200. The single, "Untouchable", peaked at number 95 on the Billboard Hot 100 chart. The second single from the project, "No Smoke", peaked at number 61 on the Billboard Hot 100.

2018–2019: Until Death Call My Name and AI YoungBoy 2
Gaulden released the single "Outside Today" on January 6, 2018. The song became Gaulden's highest charting song, peaking at number 31 on the Billboard Hot 100. He announced his debut studio album, Until Death Call My Name on January 11, shortly after signing a joint venture deal with Atlantic Records. The album was released on April 27, 2018. Despite being arrested in February 2018, Gaulden promised a new mixtape. Gaulden was released from jail on March 15, and his next mixtape Master The Day Of Judgement was released on May 19, 2018. Throughout the summer of 2018, Gaulden released a series of four EPs, each containing four tracks. The first of which, 4Respect, was released on August 24, followed by 4Freedom, 4Loyalty and 4WhatImportant on August 30, September 6 and 14, respectively. In conjunction with the final part being released, all four EPs were combined into a 16-track compilation titled 4Respect 4Freedom 4Loyalty 4WhatImportant. On September 7, Gaulden released his mixtape Decided, featuring a sole guest appearance from Trippie Redd. On December 20, Gaulden released another mixtape, Realer, featuring guest appearances from Lil Baby and Plies.

By January 2019, Gaulden was on YouTube's Top Music Artists list in the United States for the previous 101 weeks, which made him the most-watched musician across all genres. This was mainly due in part to his consistency of releasing music regularly and exclusively on YouTube. He was also the 9th best selling artist on the 2019 Billboard Mid-Year Charts and was seventh in the top ten artists ranked by on-demand audio streams without dropping a project in the first six months of 2019.

Gaulden was sentenced to 14 months on house arrest following a probation violation earlier in 2019. Due to the house arrest, he was unable to record music from anywhere besides his house. On September 25, 2019, Gaulden released the "aptly titled" single "House Arrest Tingz".

On October 4, 2019, Gaulden released the song "Bandit", with rapper Juice WRLD, released as the final new song by Juice WRLD as a lead artist before his death. The song reached number 10 on the US Billboard Hot 100, becoming NBA Youngboy's highest charting single.

On October 10, 2019, Gaulden released his mixtape AI YoungBoy 2, and debuted at number one on the US Billboard 200. The mixtape is a sequel to his 2017 breakout AI Youngboy and features 18 songs, including the previously released song "Slime Mentality". Gaulden was able to get his first number one album on the Billboard 200 because the album had accumulated 144.7 million on-demand audio streams during its first week, becoming one of the top ten biggest streaming debuts of 2019.

2020–2021: 38 Baby 2, Top, and Sincerely, Kentrell
In February 2020, Gaulden released his mixtape, Still Flexin, Still Steppin. It debuted at number two on the US Billboard 200, becoming his second-highest charting album after his 2019 number-one album AI YoungBoy 2. On April 24, 2020, Gaulden released his mixtape 38 Baby 2, debuting at number one on the Billboard 200. On August 20, 2020, Gaulden announced the release of his second studio album titled Top, which was released on September 11. It includes the Hot 100-charting singles "All In", "Kacey Talk", and "My Window" featuring Lil Wayne. The album debuted at number one on the Billboard 200 and became his third number-one album in under one year.

On November 11, 2020, Gaulden released his fourth solo project of 2020, the mixtape Until I Return. It was released exclusively on YouTube, and was made available three days later to streaming services with four additional songs. The mixtape has no guest features. On November 20, 2020, Gaulden released a collaborative project with Rich the Kid, titled Nobody Safe.

On September 24, 2021, Gaulden released his third studio album, Sincerely, Kentrell from prison. The album debuted at number one on the Billboard 200 making him the third artist besides 2Pac and Lil Wayne to have a number one album while incarcerated.

As part of the album, Gaulden released the hit single "Life Support" on September 10 of that year, which saw significant success, even as he was currently incarcerated.

Following his release from jail in late October 2021, he released a number of singles beginning in November, including "Heart and Soul", "Alligator Walk", and "Blackball". The singles led up to his collaborative mixtape with Birdman, From the Bayou, which was released on December 10, 2021, after initially being announced in March 2018.

2022: Colors, The Last Slimeto, and numerous other projects
Gaulden released another mixtape, titled Colors, on January 21, 2022. This mixtape garnered attention due to the singles released previously, in which he dissed rappers King Von and NLE Choppa on the tracks "Bring the Hook" and "Know Like I Know", respectively. On March 4, 2022, Gaulden released Better than You, a collaborative mixtape with DaBaby.

On April 1, 2022, YoungBoy Never Broke Again released the Last Slimeto Sampler This led up to his fourth studio album, The Last Slimeto, which is also his final album with Atlantic Records, and was released on August 5, 2022. In May, it was reported that Gaulden rejected CEO Craig Kallman's $25 million dollar offer to renew his Atlantic deal, calling the label out on its artist integrity. He also called to be released from the label along with fellow ex-labelmate Meek Mill. Additionally, in July 2022, he terminated his performance rights management deal with ASCAP and joined Irving Azoff-headed Global Music Rights.

Through Never Broke Again's Instagram page, it was announced that YoungBoy had finally completed his contract with Atlantic Records.

YoungBoy was featured on The Game's album Drillmatic – Heart vs. Mind on the track "O.P.P", but was later removed over a $150K fee.

On September 4, 2022, YoungBoy released the YouTube exclusive single "Purge Me". On September 5, 2022, through DJ Akademiks it was announced that YoungBoy would release a surprise mixtape titled Realer 2, presented as a sequel to his December 2018 Realer. However, the mixtape did not release according to plan. On September 6, 2022, at around 4 PM EST, the mixtape was released primarily to YoungBoy's YouTube channel. Just a day later on September 7, the mixtape was added to all digital streaming platforms; despite YoungBoy's departure from Atlantic Records, the mixtape was distributed through the label.

On October 7, 2022, YoungBoy released his twentieth mixtape, 3800 Degrees through Never Broke Again and Atlantic Records. The project pays homage to Juvenile's 1998 400 Degreez and Lil Wayne's 2002 500 Degreez. The mixtape features guest appearances from E-40, Mouse on tha Track, and Shy Glizzy. The project marks YoungBoy Never Broke Again's fifth release of 2022 (fourth solo).

On October 16, he announced another project, Ma' I Got a Family, to be released the same week as his twenty-first project, and his sixth release of the year (fifth solo). Just days later, the tracklist was released, announcing Nicki Minaj and Yeat as the mixtape's only features. On October 21, 2022, the mixtape was released and was presented as a DJ Drama Gangsta Grillz exclusive.

Through Billboard, on October 24, 2022, it was announced that following the completion of YoungBoy Never Broke Again's contract with Atlantic Records, YoungBoy would sign a joint venture contract between Motown Records and YoungBoy's own label Never Broke Again. The joint venture deal was signed just over a year prior in September 2021, prior to the announcement of YoungBoy's addition to the label.

On November 25, 2022, YoungBoy teamed up with Never Broke Again signee, Quando Rondo for their collaborative mixtape, 3860. The mixtape was preceded by four singles, "Give Me a Sign," Cream Soda" (Performed by Quando Rondo), "Keep Me Dry," and "It's On." Despite the project being uploaded to YoungBoy's YouTube channel, on the day of the mixtape's release, YoungBoy revealed that he did not want the mixtape to be released due to his past disputes with Atlantic Records, the label under which the mixtape was released under, subsequently leading to the removal of the mixtape from YoungBoy's YouTube channel. YoungBoy further noted that Quando respected his wishes for the mixtape to not be released, however, Atlantic Records proceeded to release the project.

On December 23, 2022, YoungBoy released the compilation album Lost Files which purely consisted of leaked songs from 2018 onwards. The project marked his final release of the year. The project peaked at #45 on the Billboard 200 selling over 18,000 copies in its first tracking week.

2023–present: I Rest My Case
On January 3, 2023, YoungBoy's label released the official artwork for his fifth studio album I Rest My Case on their Instagram. On January 4, 2023, YoungBoy released a series of promotional singles, most notably "Black" which peaked at number 93 respectively on the Billboard Hot 100. The album was released on January 6, 2023, and is YoungBoy's first project under a new artist deal with Motown Records. The album peaked at number nine on the Billboard 200, marking YoungBoy's lowest charting studio album.

Through Billboard, on February 1, 2023, YoungBoy was announced to appear on the magazine's cover which was released alongside an interview. Appearing on the cover marked YoungBoy's first in five years since his October 2017 appearance on The Fader. Through the interview, it was noted that YoungBoy's sixth full-length studio album titled Don't Try This at Home is in the works.

On February 24, 2023, YoungBoy appeared as a feature on Irvine, California native Yeat's third studio album Afterlyfe on the second track, "Shmunk". Weeks later, it was announced that on March 17, 2023, YoungBoy would appear as a feature on "I Don't Mind", the fifth track on Lil Pump's fourth studio album, Lil Pump 2.

Musical style
NBA YoungBoy has been noted for his melodic vocals and "signature aggressive punch and high energy". He is known for his consistency in releasing music, with his work ethic described as being of a "rapid fire pace". YoungBoy has released over twenty-six studio albums, EP's, and mixtapes since 2015. In 2023, he described his tendency to release music constantly as a "disease"."The music is therapy, but I can't stop it when I want, and the lifestyle is just a big distraction from your real purpose."

Legal issues
Despite his success as a musical artist, Gaulden had been involved in numerous criminal run-ins and a civil lawsuit.

2014: Robbery charge and juvenile detention 
In late 2014, Gaulden was arrested for robbery and sent to a detention center in Tallulah, Louisiana. He was released after serving 6 months.

2016–2017: Attempted murder 
On November 28, 2016, U.S. Marshals arrested Gaulden before a concert in Austin, Texas, accusing him of jumping out of a vehicle and opening fire on a group of people on a South Baton Rouge street. Gaulden was charged with two counts of attempted murder. Gaulden was in jail until May 2017 for attempted first degree murder. Speaking on his incarceration, he said "I don't think they really target, but if you got a name, they know who you is, you do something, they gonna come get you, and whoever you're with and whatever they do, you're accountable for it just because you got the biggest name. That's how that shit go." Facing two counts of attempted first-degree murder, he pleaded guilty to a reduced charge of aggravated assault with a firearm. On August 22, 2017, he was sentenced to a suspended ten-year prison term and three years of active probation.

2018: Assault, weapons and kidnapping 
Gaulden was arrested before a concert at The Moon nightclub in Tallahassee on February 25, 2018. Gaulden had a warrant in the state of Georgia for allegedly committing assault, weapons violations and kidnapping. Hotel surveillance footage leaked shortly following his arrest showing Gaulden assaulting his former girlfriend. On March 15, 2018, he was released from jail on $75,000 bail.

2019: Assault and battery lawsuit 
On March 12, 2019, it was reported that Gaulden and Never Broke Again artist Tyquian "Quando Rondo" Bowman were filed suit by a man claiming to be the rappers' bodyguard, tour manager and/or tour DJ for assault, battery and emotional distress. The lawsuit claims that on December 21, 2018, during a concert in Florence, South Carolina, the two performers were annoyed by a crazed fan resulting in an argument. The claimant states that he, Gaulden, Bowman and members of their entourage were escorted backstage by management, venue owners and concert organizers where he claims to have been assaulted by the two aforementioned. The person, who claimed was confronted by the two defendants, commented that Bowman (although unprovoked) instigated the incident by attempting to force him back onstage to break up the fan craze to secure his team, but after he refused, Bowman and Gaulden immediately assaulted him as he tried to explain to both parties of his deeds. It resulted in the victim sustaining a "cracked tooth, bloody face and injuries to his reputation". Gaulden's attorney stated that he had no prior knowledge of the incident, but would look into the outcome of the lawsuit.

2019: Miami shooting, probation violation, and house arrest 
While Gaulden was on probation, on May 12, 2019, he was involved in a shooting in Miami in which he returned fire after a shooter in a black Cadillac Escalade opened fire, injuring Gaulden's girlfriend and killing a bystander. Though Gaulden's charges for the shooting itself were dismissed, he was found to be in the company of Ben Fields and Trulondrick "Boomer" Norman, which violated a special condition of his probation; for this violation, the judge ordered him to spend 90 days in jail, banned him from performing for the next 14 months, and sentenced him to house arrest with electronic monitoring for the remainder of his probation.

2019–2020: Probation termination and renewal 
On December 13, 2019, the judge officially terminated Gaulden's probation for two counts of attempted murder. However, he was sentenced to a year of probation five days later after he pleaded guilty to simple assault in the case involving his ex-girlfriend.

2020: Baton Rouge arrest for Federal firearm and drug offenses 
On September 28, 2020, Gaulden was among sixteen people arrested in Baton Rouge, Louisiana on various charges, including distribution and manufacturing of drugs and possession of stolen firearms. His lawyer denied any guilt, stating "There was no indication that he had any guns or drugs on him at the time of the arrest". As news of his arrest surfaced, Gaulden deleted all of his social media, including his Instagram and Twitter accounts.

2021–2022: California Federal firearm charge and Baton Rouge Federal firearm and drug charge 
On March 22, 2021, Gaulden was arrested by federal agents in Los Angeles executing a federal warrant stemming from his September 2020 arrest in Baton Rouge. Officers attempted to stop a vehicle with Gaulden in it to serve the warrant when Gaulden took off on foot. After a search that involved using a K9, Gaulden was found and booked on federal firearms charges. On October 26, 2021, he was released from jail on a $1.5 million bail.

On February 24, 2022, following YoungBoy's September 2020 Baton Rouge arrest in the process of recording a music video, Gaulden's team filed a motion to suppress the firearm obtained during the arrest alongside the video and photo evidence via an SD card from the video shoot for "Chopper City." On March 2, 2022, the motion to suppress the video evidence was granted, however, the motion to suppress the firearm was denied. Following Gaulden's win, a trial date was set fro May 16, 2022, however, it was later pushed back due to unforeseeable actions. In June 2022, Gaulden's team won a pre-trial motion as his team filed for a removal of evidence due to prosecutorial misconduct.

During the trial for Gaulden's California Federal firearm charge, on July 12, 2022, the prosecution's attempt to use lyrics from YoungBoy's music, "Life Support" and "Gunsmoke", both of which in YoungBoy raps about FN Herstals was ruled to not be used against him. On July 15, 2022, Gaulden was found not guilty of his federal firearms charges from California, due to a lack of evidence linking him to intentionally possessing the weapons found.

2023–present: Baton Rouge Federal firearm charge 
On March 9, 2023, regarding Gaulden's Baton Rouge Federal firearm charge, the prosecution team filed a motion to challenge Gaulden's motion to suppress the video and photo evidence - which they won in March 2022. It was noted that the three-judge panel would come to a decision in the following weeks.

On March 15, 2023, it was announced that judge Shelly Dick lifted restrictions from Gaulden's house arrest. In the report, two conditions were removed. Firstly, Gaulden would be allowed to have more than three visitors at a time without a curfew restriction.

Feuds 

From 2018 to 2021, YoungBoy and Chicago rapper King Vona signee of Lil Durk's imprint Only The Familybegan to diss each other through social media and their music, in what was initially taken as a joke. In particular, Von who made several videos mocking viral clips of YoungBoy as Von noted that YoungBoy fakes in his music: "the fuck YoungBoy talking about on this song, bruh? He's talking crazy, he ain't even like that. I'm on his a** now. You got caps in yo raps."

Business ventures

Amp talk show
On December 8, 2022, it was announced through the Never Broke Again Instagram that YoungBoy would ink a deal with Amazon's Amp. Following the announcement of the partnership, each Friday YoungBoy would host the radio show at 8 PM Central Time. Each episode would feature popular guests and celebrities such as Blueface, Rich the Kid, and Ja Morant; YoungBoy would interview his guests following their arrival.

Personal life
At 23 years old, Gaulden is the father of ten children with eight different women. Two of his sons, Kayden and Kacey, appeared in the video for his single, "Kacey Talk".

In a 2017 profile for The Fader, Gaulden named Kamron as one of his sons. Kamron was born in July 2016 to Starr Thigpen just weeks after Kayden. However, a DNA test later confirmed that he was not the biological father.

On January 7, 2023, Gaulden married his long-time girlfriend and the mother of two of his children, Jazlyn Mychelle Hayes.

Since his move to Utah, Gaulden has been visited by missionaries of the Church of Jesus Christ of Latter-day Saints, and he has stated his intention to be baptized into the church once his ankle monitor is removed.

Discography

 Until Death Call My Name (2018)
Top (2020)
Sincerely, Kentrell (2021)
The Last Slimeto (2022)
I Rest My Case (2023)

Awards and nominations

See also

• List of highest-certified music artists in the United States

References

External links
 
 
 YoungBoy Never Broke Again on SoundCloud
 YoungBoy Never Broke Again on Spotify
 YoungBoy Never Broke Again on YouTube

1999 births
Living people
21st-century American rappers
21st-century African-American male singers
African-American male rappers
African-American male singer-songwriters
American hip hop singers
American people convicted of assault
American people convicted of attempted murder
American prisoners and detainees
Atlantic Records artists
Gangsta rappers
Motown artists
Musicians from Baton Rouge, Louisiana
Rappers from Louisiana
Singer-songwriters from Louisiana
Southern hip hop musicians
Trap musicians